Historia de Gentibus Septentrionalibus was a monumental work by Olaus Magnus on the Nordic countries, printed in Rome 1555. It was a work which long remained for the rest of Europe the authority on Swedish matters. Its popularity increased by the numerous woodcuts of people and their customs, amazing the rest of Europe. It is still today a valuable repertory of much curious information in regard to Scandinavian customs and folklore.

It was translated into Dutch (1562), Italian (1565), German (1567), and English (1658). Abridgments of the work appeared also at Antwerp (1558 and 1562), Paris (1561), Basel (1567), Amsterdam (1586), Frankfurt (1618) and Leiden (1652).

An exemplar was given to William Cecil during the Swedish king's wooing of queen Elizabeth I of England, and in 1822 it would be referred to by Sir Walter Scott.

Notes

References 

 Olaus Magnus (1555) Historia de Gentibus Septentrionalibus, Ashgate Pub Co,  /

External links 
Historia de gentibus septentrionalibus  at Project Runeberg
 

Historiography of Sweden
Sources on Germanic paganism
1555 books
1555 in Sweden
16th-century Latin books